The Meduxnekeag River is a tributary of the Saint John River. The North Branch Meduxnekeag River rises from the outlet of a small pond in Maine and runs to its confluence with the Meduxnekeag in Wakefield, New Brunswick. The South Branch Meduxnekeag River rises from the outflow of Johnson Pond in Linneus, and runs to its confluence with the Meduxnekeag River two miles upstream from Houlton, Maine. The Meduxnekeag joins the Saint John in Woodstock, New Brunswick.

The earliest mention of the name is in the narrative of John Gyles. He states that in 1689 he visited a branch of the St. John river about ten miles to a branch called Medeockseenecasis. The suffix "asis" is a diminutive so it is possible that the name is a form of Little Meductic. The current spelling was first seen in 1840.

In New Brunswick, the watershed of the Meduxnekeag is home to the richest, most diverse, and highest concentration of remnant sites of mature Appalachian Hardwood Forest in Atlantic Canada, containing many understorey plants rare or uncommon in the province. These include black raspberry, wild ginger, maidenhair fern, showy orchis, wild coffee, and numerous others.

Animals commonly found in the watershed include the moose, white-tailed deer, black bear, eastern coyote, red fox, raccoon, beaver, eastern chipmunk, striped skunk, red squirrel, snowshoe hare, mink, weasels, porcupine, and various mice, voles, and shrews.

Significant sections of the Meduxnekeag are easy to canoe or kayak in high or medium water conditions (generally in May and June, and in September and October; also in July/August in wet summers). Annual canoe races are held in both Maine and New Brunswick in May. Recreational canoeists traditionally put in just below the bridge on the North Branch (just above the confluence) and take out in downtown Woodstock, a half-day canoe depending on lingering time, passing through scenic, mostly forested country. The final 2 km before Woodstock is through an extensive wetland.

The intervales and islands of the Meduxnekeag are locally celebrated for the edible fiddlehead ostrich fern, harvested in May.

References

See also
List of rivers of Maine
List of rivers of New Brunswick

Tributaries of the Saint John River (Bay of Fundy)
Rivers of New Brunswick
Rivers of Aroostook County, Maine
International rivers of North America